As of July 2016, the International Union for Conservation of Nature (IUCN) lists 2875 data deficient arthropod species. 30% of all evaluated arthropod species are listed as data deficient. 
The IUCN also lists 17 arthropod subspecies as data deficient.

No subpopulations of arthropods have been evaluated by the IUCN.

This is a complete list of data deficient arthropod species and subspecies as evaluated by the IUCN.

Arachnids

Branchiopoda
Streptocephalus kargesi

Millipedes

Maxillopoda
Maxillopoda includes barnacles, copepods and a number of related animals. There are 22 species in the class Maxillopoda assessed as data deficient.

Sessilia
Armatobalanus nefrens
Balanus aquila

Calanoida
There are 19 species in the order Calanoida assessed as data deficient.

Diaptomids

Temorids
Epischura massachusettsensis

Harpacticoida
Thermomesochra reducta

Xiphosura

Malacostracans
Malacostraca includes crabs, lobsters, crayfish, shrimp, krill, woodlice, and many others. There are 1130 malacostracan species and 17 malacostracan subspecies assessed as data deficient.

Isopods
Echinodillo cavaticus
Styloniscus sp. nov.

Decapods
There are 1128 decapod species and 17 decapod subspecies assessed as data deficient.

Parastacids

Gecarcinucids

Atyids

Species

Subspecies

Cambarids

Potamonautids

Pseudothelphusids

Potamids

Palaemonids

Species

Subspecies

Trichodactylids

Spiny lobsters

Lobsters

Slipper lobsters

Reef lobsters

Other decapod species

Insects
There are 1702 insect species assessed as data deficient.

Blattodea
Miriamrothschildia zonatus

Orthoptera
There are 50 species in the order Orthoptera assessed as data deficient.

Acridids

Tettigoniids

Phaneropterids

Other Orthoptera species

Hymenoptera
There are 316 species in the order Hymenoptera assessed as data deficient.

Colletids

Melittids

Apids

Halictids

Andrenids

Megachilids

Mantises

Lepidoptera
Lepidoptera comprises moths and butterflies. There are 87 species in the order Lepidoptera assessed as data deficient.

Pyralids

Swallowtail butterflies

Lycaenids

Nymphalids

Skippers

Other Lepidoptera species

Beetles
There are 377 beetle species assessed as data deficient.

Geotrupids

Longhorn beetles

Click beetles

Erotylids

Scarabaeids

Other beetle species

Odonata
Odonata includes dragonflies and damselflies. There are 868 species in the order Odonata assessed as data deficient.

Platystictids

Chlorogomphids

Argiolestids

Chlorocyphids

Isostictids

Platycnemidids

Megapodagrionids

Gomphids

Cordulegastrids

Corduliids

Calopterygids

Coenagrionids

Euphaeids

Macromiids

Lestids

Aeshnids

Libellulids

Polythorids

Other Odonata species

See also 
 Lists of IUCN Red List data deficient species
 List of least concern arthropods
 List of near threatened arthropods
 List of vulnerable arthropods
 List of endangered arthropods
 List of critically endangered arthropods
 List of recently extinct arthropods

References 

Arthropods
Data deficient arthropods
Data deficient arthropods